Lower Alsace Township is a township in Berks County, Pennsylvania. The population was 4,475 at the 2010 census. By area, it is the smallest township in Berks County.

Geography
According to the U.S. Census Bureau, the township has a total area of 4.7 square miles (12.3 km), of which 4.7 square miles (12.2 km) is land and 0.04 square mile (0.1 km) (0.42%) is water.

Adjacent townships
Alsace Township (north)
Exeter Township (east)
Cumru Township (south)
Adjacent cities and boroughs
Reading (west)
Mt. Penn (middle)

Demographics

As of the 2000 census, of there were 4,478 people, 1,881 households, and 1,250 families living in the township.  The population density was 950.9 people per square mile (367.1/km).  There were 1,956 housing units at an average density of 415.4/sq mi (160.3/km).  The racial makeup of the township was 96.56% White, 0.69% African American, 0.89% Asian, 1.12% from other races, and 0.74% from two or more races. Hispanic or Latino of any race were 2.84% of the population.

There were 1,881 households, out of which 27.1% had children under the age of 18 living with them, 55.6% were married couples living together, 7.4% had a female householder with no husband present, and 33.5% were non-families. 27.8% of all households were made up of individuals, and 14.1% had someone living alone who was 65 years of age or older.  The average household size was 2.38 and the average family size was 2.92.

In the township, the population was spread out, with 21.7% under the age of 18, 6.8% from 18 to 24, 28.4% from 25 to 44, 23.6% from 45 to 64, and 19.5% who were 65 years of age or older. The median age was 41 years. For every 100 females, there were 95.1 males.  For every 100 females age 18 and over, there were 90.4 males.

The median income for a household in the township was $42,708, and the median income for a family was $50,110. Males had a median income of $37,253 versus $25,891 for females. The per capita income for the township was $23,379.  About 2.7% of families and 3.9% of the population were below the poverty line, including 5.3% of those under age 18 and 2.2% of those age 65 or over.

Transportation

No numbered highways pass through Lower Alsace Township. Main thoroughfares in the township include Carsonia Avenue, Friedensburg Road and Antietam Road.

Gallery

References

Townships in Berks County, Pennsylvania
Townships in Pennsylvania